TPON might refer to:

 Telephony over Passive Optical Network, kind of telephone network
 The Power of Nightmares, 2004 documentary series
 The Philippine Order of Narnians, Filipino community of CS Lewis enthusiasts

 Two Parties One Nation, an Instagram-based mock government community